Ralph Hancock may refer to:
 Ralph Hancock (landscape gardener) (1893–1950), Welsh landscape gardener and author
 Ralph Hancock (cricketer) (1887–1914), English cricketer
 Ralph C. Hancock, professor of political science at Brigham Young University (BYU)